Vivian Blaine (born Vivian Stapleton; November 21, 1921 – December 9, 1995) was an American actress and singer, best known for originating the role of Miss Adelaide in the musical theater production of Guys and Dolls, as well as appearing in the subsequent film version, in which she co-starred with Marlon Brando, Jean Simmons and Frank Sinatra.

Early years
Blaine was born in Newark, New Jersey to Leo Stapleton, an insurance agent, and Wilhelmina Tepley. The cherry-blonde-haired Blaine appeared on local stages as early as 1934 and she started touring after graduating from South Side High School.

Personal appearances 
Blaine was a touring singer with dance bands starting in 1937.

At one point in the 1940s, she was the top-billed act at New York's Copacabana nightclub. In his book, Dean and Me: (A Love Story), Jerry Lewis wrote about appearing at the club when Blaine was on the same bill: "We [Lewis and Dean Martin, as the double act Martin and Lewis] weren't even the top-billed act. That honor went to a Broadway singing star named Vivian Blaine, who'd conquered Manhattan, gone out to Hollywood to make movies for 20th Century Fox, then returned to the Big Apple in triumph. Vivian was a lovely and very talented actress and singer ..."

Film 

In 1942, Blaine's agent and soon-to-be husband Manny Franks signed her to a contract with Twentieth Century-Fox, and she moved to Hollywood, sharing top billing with Laurel and Hardy in Jitterbugs (1943) and starring in Greenwich Village (1944), Something for the Boys (1944), Nob Hill (1945), and State Fair (1945).

Stage 

Following her Fox years, Blaine returned to the stage, making her Broadway debut as Miss Adelaide in the Frank Loesser musical Guys and Dolls in 1950. Her character Miss Adelaide has been engaged to inveterate gambler Nathan Detroit played by Sam Levene for 14 years, a condition which, according to her song "Adelaide's Lament", has given her a psychosomatic cold as well as chronic heartbreak.  

After the show's 1,200-performance Broadway run, Blaine and Levene reprised their roles as Miss Adelaide and Nathan Detroit in the first UK production of Guys and Dolls, which opened at London's West End Coliseum a few days before the 1953 Coronation; the two stars performed their roles 553 times, including a Royal Command Variety Performance for Queen Elizabeth on November 9, 1953. Blaine as Miss Adelaide, Levene as Nathan Detroit and Robert Alda as Sky Masterson also performed twice daily in a reduced version of Guys and Dolls when the first Las Vegas production opened a six-month run at the Royal Nevada, September 7, 1955, the first time a Broadway musical was performed on the strip. Vivian Blaine recreated her role as Miss Adelaide in the film version in 1955. 

Blaine also appeared on Broadway in A Hatful of Rain, Say, Darling, Enter Laughing, Company, and Zorba, as well as participating in the touring companies of musicals such as Gypsy.

Television 
Blaine was a special guest during the This is Your Life tribute episode to Laurel and Hardy, seen over NBC-TV on December 1, 1954. Blaine had worked with the duo in the film Jitterbugs and had fond memories of the experience.

On the 25th annual Tony Awards in 1971, she appeared as a guest performer and sang "Adelaide's Lament" from Guys and Dolls.

Blaine always commented that working with manager Rob Cipriano reminded her of working with her first husband Manny Franks.

Later in her career, her television career took off, with guest appearances on shows like Fantasy Island, The Love Boat, and a recurring role in the cult hit Mary Hartman, Mary Hartman.

Her final onscreen appearance was in "Broadway Malady", a Season 1 episode of Murder, She Wrote.

Personal life 
Blaine's first marriage, to Franks, lasted from 1945 to 1956. She then married Milton Rackmil, president of Universal Studios and Decca Records, in 1959, and recorded several albums prior to their 1961 divorce. In 1973, she married Stuart Clark. 

In 1983, Blaine became the first celebrity to make public service announcements for AIDS-related causes. She made numerous appearances in support of the then-fledgling AIDS Project Los Angeles (APLA) and in 1983 recorded her cabaret act for AEI Records, which donated its royalties to the new group; this included the last recordings of her songs from Guys and Dolls.  Her prior albums for Mercury Records have all subsequently been reissued on CD.

According to Blaine, she was a registered Democrat and a lifelong practicing Roman Catholic.

Death 
Blaine died of congestive heart failure on December 9, 1995, aged 74.

Filmography

Film

Television

Stage work

One Touch of Venus (1948)
Bloomer Girl (1949)
Light Up the Sky (1949)
Guys and Dolls (1950–53)
Panama Hattie (1955)
A Hatful of Rain (1956–58) 
Rain (1957)
Say, Darling (1958) 
Gypsy (1960)
A Streetcar Named Desire (1961) 
Born Yesterday (1961)
Gypsy (1962)
Enter Laughing (1963)
Mr. President (1964) 
Guys and Dolls (1964-1966)
Never Too Late (1965)
Cactus Flower (1966–67)
Damn Yankees (1967) 
Any Wednesday (1968)
Don't Drink the Water (1968–69)
Take Me Along (1968)
The Marriage-Go-Round (1970)
Zorba (1970–71) 
Company (1971–73)
Light Up the Sky (1971)
The Glass Menagerie (1972) 
Follies (1973)
I Do! I Do! (1973) 
Twigs (1973–74)
Hello, Dolly! (1974)
The Best of Everybody (1975) 
Brothers and Sisters (1975)
Light Up the Sky (1975)
Almost on a Runway (1976) 
How the Other Half Loves (1977)
Last of the Red Hot Lovers (1977–79)
The Boy Friend (1979)
The Prisoner of Second Avenue (1979)
Zorba (1984) (replacement for Lila Kedrova)
Hello, Dolly! (1985)

References

Further reading
 Oderman, Stuart, Talking to the Piano Player 2. BearManor Media, 2009.

External links

 
 
 
 
 
 Vivian Blaine Papers at the New York Public Library
 
 Vivian Blaine papers, 1916-1995, held by the Billy Rose Theatre Division, New York Public Library for the Performing Arts

1921 births
1995 deaths
Actresses from Newark, New Jersey
American film actresses
American musical theatre actresses
American stage actresses
American television actresses
Apex Records artists
Donaldson Award winners
Musicians from Newark, New Jersey
Malcolm X Shabazz High School alumni
20th Century Studios contract players
20th-century American actresses
20th-century American singers
20th-century American women singers
American Roman Catholics
California Democrats
New York (state) Democrats
New Jersey Democrats